Pool C of the 2017 Fed Cup Europe/Africa Zone Group I was one of four pools in the Europe/Africa zone of the 2017 Fed Cup. Four teams competed in a round robin competition, with the top team and the bottom team proceeding to their respective sections of the play-offs: the top team played for advancement to the World Group II Play-offs, while the bottom team faced potential relegation to Group II.

Standings 

Standings are determined by: 1. number of wins; 2. if two teams have the same number of wins, head-to-head record; 3. if three teams have the same number of wins, (a) number of matches won in the group, then (b) percentage of sets won in the group, then (c) percentage of games won in the group, then (d) Fed Cup rankings.

Round-robin

Great Britain vs. Portugal

Turkey vs. Latvia

Great Britain vs. Latvia

Turkey vs. Portugal

Great Britain vs. Turkey

Latvia vs. Portugal

References

External links 
 Fed Cup website

2017 Fed Cup Europe/Africa Zone